Škabrijel is a mountain, 646 metres high, above the town of Nova Gorica in Slovenia. The mountain was named after the Archangel Gabriel.

History 
During the First World War it was a stronghold of the Austro-Hungarian Army, full of tunnels and trenches. The mountain was fought over in the Eleventh Battle of the Isonzo, when the top of the Škabrijel was lost and recaptured nine times by the Austro-Hungarians. One officer stated: "Around 6e in the morning, an Italian attacked for the first time, and then it went all day. But we always repulsed him with hand grenades, machine guns tried to take the trenches. I was on the left wing with six other men, strong and fearless. They went forward when he attacked, even the second time they persisted even though they were wounded and one dead. We held out and repulsed him with hand grenades." Due to artillery bombardment by the Italian Army during WW1, the hill is bare.

Geography 
The mountain is northeast of a town called Nova Gorica. The Julian Alps and the Carnic Alps are to the north of the mountain. The Karst Black Hills, the Trstelj, and the Adriatic Sea are in the south. In the east there is the Trnovo Forest Plateau.

References 

Geography of Slovenia
Nova Gorica
Mountains under 1000 metres